Masitaoka FC is a Botswanan football club based in Gaborone that currently competes in the Botswana Premier League.

History
The club was founded in 1962 but not officially registered with the Botswana Football Association until 1968. It was originally based in 
Molepolole but has since relocated to the capital Gaborone, although the club still plays its home matches at Molepolole Stadium. The club is named after the Bakwena Tribe regiment, Masitaoka of 1906. It gained promotion to the Botswana Premier League for the first time for the 2020–21 season.

References

External links
Official website
Official Facebook
Soccerway profile
Global Sports Archive profile

Association football clubs established in 1968
Football clubs in Botswana
Football clubs in Gaborone